Nazanin Boniadi (born May 22, 1980) is a British actress and activist. Born in Tehran and raised in London, she went to university in the United States, where she landed her first major acting role as Leyla Mir in the medical drama General Hospital (2007–2009) and its spin-off General Hospital: Night Shift (2007). Since then, she has played Nora in the CBS sitcom How I Met Your Mother (2011), Fara Sherazi in the Showtime spy thriller series Homeland (2013–2014), Esther in the historical drama film Ben-Hur (2016), Clare Quayle in the Starz sci-fi thriller series Counterpart (2017–2018), Zahra Kashani in the action thriller film Hotel Mumbai (2018), and Bronwyn in the Prime Video fantasy series The Lord of the Rings: The Rings of Power (2022–present).

Boniadi was an Amnesty International spokesperson from 2009 to 2015 and served as a board member for the Center for Human Rights in Iran from October 2015 until February 2021. Her focus has been on youth and women's rights.

Early life
Boniadi was born in Tehran, Iran, in the aftermath of the Iranian Revolution. Less than a month after her birth, she and her parents left Iran and applied to become political refugees in London. She performed violin and ballet as a young girl.

She attended an independent school in Hampstead and earned a bachelor's degree, with honours, in biological sciences from the University of California, Irvine (UCI). At UCI, she won the Chang Pin-Chun Undergraduate Research Award for molecular research involving cancer treatment and heart transplant rejection. She was also Assistant Editor-in-Chief of MedTimes, UCI's undergraduate medical newspaper. In 2009, she studied a contemporary drama short course at the Royal Academy of Dramatic Art in London.

Career
Boniadi changed her career path from science and started pursuing acting in 2006. Her first major acting role was as Leyla Mir on the daytime drama General Hospital and its SOAPnet spin-off series General Hospital: Night Shift, making her the first contract actor to play a Middle Eastern character in American daytime television history. She is also the first actress born in Iran to ever be on contract on an American soap opera.

She was nominated for an NAACP Image Award for Outstanding Actress in a Daytime Drama Series in 2008 for her role in General Hospital.

Boniadi has also played supporting roles in several major Hollywood film productions, such as Charlie Wilson's War (directed by Mike Nichols), Iron Man (directed by Jon Favreau), and The Next Three Days (directed by Paul Haggis).

She played Nora, a love interest for Neil Patrick Harris' character Barney Stinson, on the sixth season of the hit CBS show How I Met Your Mother. She reprised this role during the show's seventh and ninth seasons.

In May 2013, Boniadi joined the cast of Homeland season 3 as CIA analyst Fara Sherazi. She was promoted to a series regular for the show's fourth season, for which she shared a Screen Actors Guild Award nomination for Outstanding Performance by an Ensemble in a Drama Series in 2015.

Boniadi also appeared in an eight episode arc on season 3 of Scandal as antagonist Adnan Salif. She portrayed Esther, the title character's wife, in the 2016 remake of Ben-Hur.

She narrated the soundtrack to the 2014 Iranian documentary film, To Light a Candle, made by Maziar Bahari and focusing on the state sanctioned persecution of Baháʼís in Iran.

She starred with Dev Patel and Armie Hammer in the 2018 feature film Hotel Mumbai, a dramatisation of the 2008 Mumbai attacks. For her role as British-Iranian heiress Zahra Kashani, Boniadi received a nomination for Best Actress in a Leading Role at the Australian Academy of Cinema and Television Arts (AACTA) Awards in 2019.

From 2018 to 2019, Boniadi received critical acclaim for portraying the series regular role of Clare Quayle in the Starz espionage drama Counterpart.

In early 2020, it was revealed that Boniadi had been cast in an undisclosed role in The Lord Of The Rings: The Rings of Power on Amazon Prime. February 2022, it was announced she would be playing the character of Bronwyn, described as a single mother and healer.

Activism

She was a spokesperson for Amnesty International USA (AIUSA), with a focus on the unjust conviction and treatment of Iranian youth, women and prisoners of conscience, from 2009 until 2015. She has her own official blog page on the AIUSA website and continues to partner with them. In 2020, she was appointed as an ambassador for Amnesty International UK, with a focus on women and Iran.

Boniadi provided a voiceover to AIUSA's "Power of Words" public service announcement with Morgan Freeman, which won a Webby Award; campaigned with the organization for the International Violence Against Women Act (I-VAWA); served as a panellist and emcee for events related to Iranian rights, and spearheaded The Neda Project with AIUSA.

In December 2010, she initiated an Amnesty International petition for Iranian film directors Jafar Panahi and Mohammad Rasoulof, who had been convicted of "propaganda against the state". The petition generated more than 21,000 signatures, including prominent Hollywood directors and actors. On 8 June 2011, she joined a delegation, led by Hollywood director Paul Haggis and AIUSA Executive Director Larry Cox, to deliver the petition to the Iran Mission to the United Nations in New York.

On 3 June 2011, Boniadi joined Sarah Shourd in a rolling hunger strike and wrote an article in support of the Free the Hikers campaign, pertaining to the imprisonment of Shane Bauer and Josh Fattal in Iran.

Boniadi received the 2011 Social Cinema Award at the Ischia Global Film & Music Festival for her human rights work with Amnesty International.

On 9 April 2012, Boniadi returned to her alma mater, University of California, Irvine, in support of the Education Under Fire campaign, calling for an end to state sanctioned discrimination and persecution of Baháʼís in Iran.

Boniadi delivered the keynote closing remarks at the 2012 XX Factor, Amnesty International USA's annual town hall meeting on women's rights, in Washington, D.C.

In December 2012, Boniadi worked with Roxana Saberi to launch an Amnesty International petition and campaign to free wrongfully imprisoned filmmaker Behrouz Ghobadi, brother of acclaimed filmmaker Bahman Ghobadi, in Iran. The petition included signatures from prominent Hollywood directors and actors, as well as major film industry organizations and festivals. On 22 January 2013, Amnesty International announced that Behrouz Ghobadi had been released on bail from prison in Iran.

She was a keynote speaker at Congresswoman Eddie Bernice Johnson's 13th annual "A World of Women for World Peace" conference in Dallas, Texas in May 2013.

She has written op-eds for media outlets such as CNN, The Washington Post, and Defense One. 
In 2014, Boniadi was selected as a term member by the think tank Council on Foreign Relations. She was subsequently selected as a lifetime member of the CFR in 2020.

She served as a member of the board of directors of the Center for Human Rights in Iran from October 2015 until February 2021.

In April 2019, she was interviewed by CBC News Network anchor Natasha Fatah about the fate of human rights lawyer, Nasrin Sotoudeh, recently sentenced for up to 38 years in Tehran, Iran. She has also appeared on BBC World News and CNN International.

The Program for Torture Victims awarded Boniadi their 2014 City of Second Chances Award. In 2018, she was selected by People Magazine as one of their '25 Women Changing the World'. In 2020, she received the Freedom House Raising Awareness Award, and the Ellis Island Medal of Honor.

In September 2022, she became active during the Mahsa Amini protests, and urged foreign governments to aid the protesters. On October 14, 2022, she met with Vice President Kamala Harris, following the protests in Iran.

In an informal session of United Nations Security Council, she denounced as a "myth" the idea that the hijab was a part of Iran's culture.

Personal life
Boniadi is fluent in English and Persian. She lives in Los Angeles, California.

Since she and her parents fled in her infancy, Boniadi has only once visited Iran, as a teenager.

Scientology
In the mid 2000s, she was a dedicated Scientologist. Her mother had also been a Scientologist.

In late 2004 to early 2005, she allegedly had a brief relationship with actor Tom Cruise. According to claims in the documentary Going Clear, her acquaintance with Cruise was not accidental and the Church of Scientology prepared and planted her for this role wanting to ensure his commitment to the church after drifting away from it during his marriage to Nicole Kidman. The Church also vetted her along with dozens of other women as a potential wife for Cruise, but she was not selected.

In October 2004, Boniadi was volunteering for the Office of Special Affairs in Los Angeles when she was told by Church official Greg Wilhere that she had been selected for a special project. Boniadi was told that her dental braces had to be removed and that her red hair highlights had to be corrected; she was also encouraged to end her relationship with her longtime boyfriend. After being flown to New York by the church, Boniadi learned that her project was to become a suitable girlfriend for Cruise. 

According to Boniadi, Cruise initially overwhelmed her with the intensity of his affection but she was isolated from her family and the two of them were rarely alone, always surrounded by an entourage of Scientologists. Allegedly, he became cool and withdrawn after something she said to David Miscavige was misconstrued as an insult. She was later asked to leave and move into the Celebrity Centre.  

After their relationship ended in January 2005, Boniadi confessed her devastation to a friend and fellow church member. She was allegedly punished by having to dig ditches at midnight and scrub floor tiles.  The Church of Scientology denied that any such project existed or that David Miscavige has any involvement in Cruise's personal life.

Afterward
Boniadi left the Church of Scientology soon afterwards and in October 2014 called herself a "non-practising Muslim".

On 10 May 2017, American journalist Tony Ortega reported on FBI testimony that Boniadi had given in January 2010 regarding her relationship with Cruise through the Church of Scientology. Boniadi's testimony describes how the Church's Office of Special Affairs selected her to be Cruise's girlfriend.

In 2017, she tweeted congratulations to Leah Remini and Mike Rinder on their series Scientology and the Aftermath winning an Emmy Award.

In a later interview with the Los Angeles Times, Boniadi described her role in Counterpart as cathartic and therapeutic, saying "sometimes there are personal traumas that you don't ever talk about publicly but you pour it into your work". She continued: "this idea of shedding indoctrination and finding out who you are for me is a strong one. It has been extremely therapeutic for me to be able to put it out into the world through my art as opposed to openly discussing it."

Filmography

Film

Television

References

Further reading

External links

 
 

1980 births
Living people
21st-century British actresses
Actresses from London
British actresses of Asian descent
British expatriate actresses in the United States
British Muslims
British film actresses
British human rights activists
British television actresses
British women activists
Former Scientologists
Iranian diaspora film people
Iranian emigrants to England
University of California, Irvine alumni
Women human rights activists